
Słubice County is a unit of territorial administration and local government (powiat) in Lubusz Voivodeship, western Poland, on the German border. It came into being on January 1, 1999, as a result of the Polish local government reforms passed in 1998.

As of 2019 its total population is 47,018. The most populated towns are Słubice with 16,705 inhabitants and Rzepin with 6,529 inhabitants.

Neighbouring counties
Słubice County is bordered by Gorzów County to the north, Sulęcin County to the east and Krosno Odrzańskie County to the south. It also borders Brandenburg in Germany to the west.

Administrative division
The county is subdivided into five gminas (four urban-rural and one rural). These are listed in the following table, in descending order of population.

References

 
Land counties of Lubusz Voivodeship